Valenti is an Italian surname, and may refer to:

People
Carlos Valenti (1888–1912), French-born painter, worked primarily in Guatemala
Dino Valenti, (1937–1994), American musician
Ed Valenti (contemporary), marketing expert; credited with creation of the infomercial genre
Fernando Valenti (1926–1990), American harpsichordist
Giada Valenti, Italian musician
Giuseppe Valenti (19th century), Italian sculptor
Jack Valenti (1921–2007), American film industry executive; president of the MPAA 1966–2004
Jessica Valenti (born 1978), American feminist blogger and writer
Joey Valenti (born 1966), American professional soccer player
John Valenti (contemporary), American singer and songwriter
Ludovico Valenti (1695–1763) Roman Catholic Cardinal, Bishop of Rimini
Mark Valenti (contemporary), American writer
Matt Valenti (contemporary), American college wrestler
Mike Valenti (born 1980), American sports talk-show radio host
Osvaldo Valenti (1906–1945), Italian film actor
Rocco Valenti (1895–date of death unknown), American New York gangster; member of the Morello crime family
Sam Valenti IV (contemporary), American record producer
Sergio Valenti (born 1985), Argentine professional football player
Shane Valenti (born 1987), Australian professional football player
Tom Valenti (born 1959), American chef and restaurateur

Characters
Sheriff Jim Valenti, character on the American television series Roswell
Kyle Valenti, character on the American television series Roswell

References